While there are no saints named St. Claire in English, there are several saints named St. Clare. They are spelled "Ste. Claire" in French.
 Clare of Assisi (1194 – 1253), founder of the Poor Clares and companion of St. Francis of Assisi
 Clare of Montefalco (c. 1268 – 1308), also known as Saint Clare of the Cross
 Claire de Remiremont, or Clarisse or Saint Cécile or Sigeberge, abbess of the Abbey of Remiremont in the Vosges
 Claire Argolanti, died 1346
 Claire Gambacorti

There is also a traditional third-century French (male) bishop and saint Clair of Nantes.

St. Claire might also refer to:

Places 
 Cape St. Claire, Maryland, an unincorporated community and a census-designated place in Anne Arundel County, Maryland
 Castel Sainte-Claire, a villa in France
 Lake St. Clair, a lake between Ontario and Michigan
 The Westin San Jose, formerly The Sainte Claire Hotel, a hotel in San Jose, California
 Sainte-Claire, Quebec, a village in Quebec
 Upper St. Clair, Pennsylvania, a township located 10 miles southwest of Pittsburgh, founded in 1788

People 
 Bonnie St. Claire, stage name of Dutch singer Bonje Cornelia Swart
 Ebba St. Claire, American baseball player
 Erin St. Claire, pen name of American author Sandra Brown
 Jasmin St. Claire, pornographic actress
 Julie St. Claire, American actress, director, and producer
 Josephine Sainte-Claire, French ballerina
 Randy St. Claire, American baseball player, son of Ebba
 St. Claire Drake, American sociologist
 St. Claire Pollock, honored by New York's Amiable Child Monument 
 René Lepage de Sainte-Claire, Canadian pioneer

Transport
 Wills Sainte Claire, American automobile
 , American steamship

Variant spellings 
See also:
Saint Clair (disambiguation)
Saint Clare (disambiguation)
Santa Clara (disambiguation) (Spanish and Portuguese)
Santa Chiara (disambiguation) (Italian)
Santa Clarita (disambiguation)
Sinclair (disambiguation)